The 1995 Miami Dolphins season was the franchise's 30th season, 26th in the National Football League, and 25th and final under head coach Don Shula. The Dolphins finished 9–7 before losing to the Bills in the playoffs.

Until the 2022 NFL Season, this marked the last time the Dolphins finished with a top 10 Offense.

Offseason

NFL Draft

1995 Expansion Draft

Transactions
July 27: The Miami Dolphins signed Defensive End Steve Emtman

Roster

Regular season

Schedule

Standings

Playoffs

AFC Wild Card Game

Dolphins quarterback Dan Marino completed 33 of 64 passes for 422 yards and two touchdowns, but also threw three interceptions. The Bills used an NFL-playoff record 341 rushing yards to gain a 27–0 lead by the start of the fourth quarter.

Don Shula's retirement
The week after Miami's playoff loss to Buffalo, Shula announced his retirement. His 347 wins as a head coach, including 257 with the Dolphins, are an NFL record. Shula coached in six Super Bowls, winning two, and in 1972 he led the only unbeaten and untied season in NFL history. Shula was inducted into the Pro Football Hall of Fame in 1997 and is considered one of the greatest coaches in NFL history.

Awards and honors
 Dan Marino, AFC Pro Bowl Selection
 Dan Marino, All-Pro Selection

Notes and references

Miami Dolphins on Pro Football Reference
Miami Dolphins on jt-sw.com

Miami
Miami Dolphins seasons
Miami Dolphins